The 2022–23 Southend United F.C. season is the club's 117th season in their history and the second season in the National League. Along with the National League, the club also participated in the FA Cup and FA Trophy.

The season covers the period from 1 July 2022 to 30 June 2023.

Players

Squad

Transfers

Transfers in

Transfers out

Pre-season and friendlies

Competitions

National League

League table

Results summary

Matches
The 2022–23 National League fixtures were announced on 6 July 2022.

FA Cup

Southend entered the FA Cup at the Fourth qualifying round.

FA Trophy

Southend entered the FA Trophy at the Third round

References

Southend United
Southend United F.C. seasons